Princess Margaret of Denmark (Margrethe Françoise Louise Marie Helene; 17 September 1895 – 18 September 1992) was a Danish princess by birth and a princess of Bourbon-Parma as the wife of Prince René of Bourbon-Parma. She was the youngest grandchild of Christian IX of Denmark and Queen Louise.

Biography

Family and background 
Princess Margaret was born on 17 September 1895, in Bernstorff Palace north of Copenhagen. She was the fifth child and only daughter of Prince Valdemar of Denmark, and his wife Princess Marie of Orléans. She was named for her mother's sister Princess Marguerite d'Orléans.

Margaret's connections to European royalty were extensive and extraordinary. Her father, Prince Valdemar, was one of the six children of King Christian IX of Denmark. He had two older brothers and three sisters. His brothers were, respectively, king Frederick VIII of Denmark and king George I of Greece, while his sisters were Queen Alexandra of the UK, Empress Dagmar of Russia and Thyra, titular queen of Hanover. 

Margaret's mother was the eldest daughter of Prince Robert, Duke of Chartres and Princess Françoise of Orléans. Her parents' marriage had been arranged by their families, as was the custom among European royalty in that era. It had been agreed at the time of her parents' wedding that all their sons would be raised Lutheran, their father's creed, and all their daughters Roman Catholic, their mother's faith. Margaret, the only daughter, thus became the first Danish princess since the Reformation to be raised a Roman Catholic. She was only fourteen years old when her mother died in 1909.

Marriage 

Raised a catholic, Margaret married a Catholic prince, her mother's relative, Prince René of Bourbon-Parma (Schwarzau, 17 October 1894 – Hellerup, Copenhagen, 30 July 1962) on 9 June 1921 at Sacred Heart of Jesus Church in Copenhagen. His father was Robert I, Duke of Parma. His mother was the Duke's second wife Princess Maria Antonia, daughter of the exiled King Miguel I of Portugal. René was the brother of Empress Zita of Austria and of Felix, the consort of Charlotte, Grand Duchess of Luxembourg.

René and Margaret had four children:
 Prince Jacques of Bourbon-Parma (9 June 1922 – 5 November 1964; traffic accident outside Roskilde) married Countess Birgitte Holstein-Ledreborg on 9 June 1947. They had three children and two grandsons.
 Princess Anne of Bourbon-Parma (18 September 1923 – 1 August 2016) she married King Michael I of Romania on 10 June 1948. They had five daughters.
 Prince Michel of Bourbon-Parma (4 March 1926 – 7 July 2018) he married Princess Yolande de Broglie-Revel on 9 June 1951 and they had five children and twelve grandchildren. They divorced in 1966. He remarried Princess Maria Pia of Savoy on 17 May 2003. 
 Prince André of Bourbon-Parma (6 March 1928 – 22 October 2011) he married Marina Gacry on 2 May 1960. They had three children and six grandchildren.

Later life 
The family was poor compared to other royalty. They chiefly resided in France, where all of their children were born. In 1939 the family fled from the Nazis and escaped to Spain. From there they went to Portugal and then to the United States. There, in New York, Margaret made a living making hats while her husband worked at a gas company and her daughter as a shop assistant. They returned to Paris after the war. In June 1951, Margaret was travelling in a car her husband was driving when they ran over a 22-year-old man, Jaja Sorensen, who died soon after being taken to hospital. She died one day after her 97th birthday, on the 69th birthday of her daughter Anne. She was the last surviving child of Prince Valdemar and the longest lived and last surviving grandchild of Christian IX.

Ancestors

References

Citations

Bibliography

 
 

1895 births
1992 deaths
Danish princesses
House of Glücksburg (Denmark)
Princesses of Bourbon-Parma
Burials at Roskilde Cathedral
Danish Roman Catholics